Srbica is a village in the municipality of Kičevo, North Macedonia. It used to be the largest village of the former municipality of Oslomej.

Demographics
As of the 2021 census, Srbica had 796 residents with the following ethnic composition:
Albanians 761
Persons for whom data are taken from administrative sources 35

According to the 2002 census, the village had a total of 1,862 inhabitants. Ethnic groups in the village include:
Albanians – 1,859
Others – 3

References

External links

Villages in Kičevo Municipality
Albanian communities in North Macedonia